The Men's singles table tennis event was a part of the Table Tennis program and took place at the Peking University Gymnasium. The tournament started on August 19 and the finals took place on August 23.

77 athletes from 44 countries took part in the men's singles event. The tournament was a single elimination tournament with a third place playoff played between the two losing semi-finalists. The top 16 seeds in the tournament received a bye to the third round. Seeds 17 through 32 received a bye to the second round, seeds 33 to 51 received a bye to the first round and seeds 52 to 77 contested the preliminary round.

Qualification

Schedule
All times are China Standard Time (UTC+8).

Seeds
Seeds for the draw of the Olympics were based on the ITTF world ranking list published on July 1, 2008. The top 16 seeded players qualified directly to the third round.

  (final, silver medalist)
  (champion, gold medalist) 
  (semifinals, bronze medalist)
  (fourth round)
  (fourth round)
  (third round)
  (third round)
  (fourth round)
  (third round)
  (third round)
  (fourth round)
  (quarterfinals)
  (fourth round)
  (fourth round)
  (fourth round)
  (third round)

The players ranked from 17 to 32 qualified directly to the second round.

  (third round)
  (third round)
  (second round)
  (third round)
  (second round)
  (third round)
  (quarterfinals)
  (quarterfinals)
  (Semifinals, fourth place)
  (fourth round)
  (second round)
  (third round)
  (third round)
  (third round)
  (quarterfinals)
  (second round)

Draw

Finals

Top half

Section 1

Section 2

Bottom half

Section 3

Section 4

Preliminary rounds

Top half

Section 1

Section 2

Bottom half

Section 3

Section 4

References

External links
 Table Tennis Official Results Book. Official Report of the XXIX Olympiad. Digitally published by the LA84 Foundation.
 2008 Olympic Games. International Table Tennis Federation.
 2008 Summer Olympics / Table Tennis / Singles, Men. Olympedia.

Table tennis at the 2008 Summer Olympics
Men's events at the 2008 Summer Olympics